The Ultimax 100 is a Singapore-made 5.56mm light machine gun, developed by the Chartered Industries of Singapore (CIS, now ST Kinetics) by a team of engineers under the guidance of American firearms designer L. James Sullivan. The weapon is extremely accurate due to its constant-recoil operating system and is one of the lightest machine guns in the world.

Work on a new light support weapon for the Singapore Army began in 1978. The weapon is produced by CIS (presently STK—Singapore Technologies Kinetics), initially in the Mark 1 version, later—the Mark 2, and currently, in  the Mark 3 and Mark 4 variant. The Ultimax 100 (also called the U 100) is used in significant numbers by the armed forces of Singapore, Croatia and the Philippines. The Mark 3 variant is currently used in the Singapore Armed Forces primarily as a support arm, and is both classified and known by soldiers as the SAW (Section Assault Weapon).

Design details
The Ultimax 100 is a gas-operated automatic weapon (capable of fully automatic fire only) with a short-stroke gas piston operating system powered by ignited powder gases diverted from the barrel through a port in the gas block. The Ultimax 100 is a locked breech weapon with a rotating bolt that contains 7 locking lugs. It fires from an open bolt position. The bolt contains both a spring extractor and a casing ejector. The weapon's non-reciprocating cocking handle is located on the left side of the receiver and occupies the forward position during firing. The Ultimax 100 is striker-fired.

The feature that grants the weapon its low recoil (compared to similar light machine guns) is the "constant recoil" principle. The overall design allows the bolt carrier group to travel all the way back without ever impacting the rear, instead stopping gradually along the axis of movement against the resistance of the return springs. Jane's International Defence Review correspondent — Andrew Tillman, in an exclusive invitation from ST Kinetics to participate in the Product Improvement Program (PIP, initiated in 1989) to test fire the gun, elaborated:

The magazine catch consists of two tapered pins on a bar, controlled by the magazine release button. The machine gun feeds from a proprietary 100-round synthetic drum magazine (early models also used 60-round drum magazines), or from a modified 20 or 30-round STANAG 4179 magazine (from the M16 rifle). An unusual feature among modern machine guns is the fact the Ultimax was purposely designed to feed from magazines as opposed to belts.

The Ultimax 100 uses a manual safety mechanism that consists of a lever installed on the left side of the receiver (just behind the trigger) with two possible settings: "S" – indicating the weapon is safe and "F" – continuous fire. An internal safety achieved through the proper arrangement of parts and mechanisms secures against premature detonation. The light machine gun was also designed to mount an M16-type bayonet and either day or night-time optics. The Ultimax 100's ergonomics are similar to that of the Thompson submachine gun, specifically the forward grip.

Widespread adoption of the design might have been compromised by its feed system. The original Ultimax 100 was meant to be used with a drum magazine holding 100 rounds. The drum magazine was bulky and difficult to reload without a special mechanism. The shape of the drum magazine also occupied more space compared to M16 magazines or the FN Minimi box holding a belt of 200 rounds. The machine gunner also could not take magazines from other squad members who were equipped with M16s.

M16 magazines were subsequently modified to allow them to be used with the production model Ultimax 100. This was done by drilling two holes right at the left feeding lip of the magazine. This improved the handiness of the weapon and allowed magazines to be loaded in the field.

The system was modified to use only STANAG compatible magazines in the Mk 4 version of the design, which was submitted for the USMC Infantry Automatic Rifle competition. This meant the original drum could no longer be used, making the design closer to the IAR than a light machine gun. This has been rectified in the latest Mk 5 variant which allows the usage of the Beta C-Mag.

Variants
Mark 1: Model with a quick-change barrel (pre-production).
Mark 2: Equipped with a fixed barrel.
Mark 3/3A: Quick-change barrel. Currently the Mark 3 variant is available in two different barrel lengths, a standard and short. The short barrel is designed for use with paratroopers and special forces. There is also an optional  VIP protection barrel. The barrel on all versions has a slotted flash suppressor and a carrying handle used to transport the weapon and assist in barrel removal. The Ultimax Mark 3 has a three-position gas regulator (early models had a five-position gas adjustment valve) that allows the rate of fire to be controlled and enables reliable operation in various environmental conditions. The gas regulator is usually pre-adjusted prior to operations. Where there is sluggish operation due to fouling, the gas setting may be increased by two clicks using the provided C-tool. The weapon features a standard pistol grip, a vertical forward grip integrated into the forend and a detachable buttstock. The mild felt recoil allows the weapon to be used effectively without the buttstock, using only the pistol and forward grips to support and aim the firearm. The adjustable bipod has a height adjustment mechanism and is secured to the weapon's forend, providing stability in a sustained-fire role. The bipod is quick-detachable and can be mounted or removed without the use of tools. The Ultimax 100 features an aperture type rear sight (with range settings for distances up to 1,200 m, graduated every 100 m) placed on a sliding scale and a forward vertical post housed in the front sight base and protected by two metal tabs. The weapon incorporates sheet metal stamping and the use of synthetic components in its design. The drum magazine, buttstock, pistol grip and forend with vertical grip are all made of an impact-resistant polymer. The Mark 3/3A can fire both the American 5.56×45mm M193 cartridge (with 1:12 (305 mm) twist barrel fitted) or the heavier SS109/M855 cartridge (178 mm (1:7 in) twist rate barrel).
Mark 4: Developed for the United States Marine Corps Infantry Automatic Rifle program, with the addition of a new fire selector module. The Marine Corps did not select the Ultimax and chose an automatic rifle based on the HK416.
Mark 5: Updated variant of the Mark 4 with a folding stock, Picatinny rails and M16 STANAG 4179 magazine well that will accept 30-round box magazines and the 100-round Beta C-Mag drum.
STK also developed a vehicle-mounted variant of the weapon for use on the Bronco All Terrain Tracked Carrier and on the Spider Light Strike Vehicle.
Mark 8: New variant unveiled at the 2012 Singapore Airshow.

Users

: Adopted to replace Colt M16 HBAR LMGs.
: Chilean Marine Corps, replaced in 2014 by the Heckler & Koch MG4.

: Komando Pasukan Katak (Kopaska) tactical diver group and Komando Pasukan Khusus (Kopassus) special forces group.

: Used by the SAJ.
: Commissioned by the Singapore Army in 1982.
: Used by the Specialna Enota Policije.
: Royal Solomon Islands Police Force purchased 50.

: Known to be used by the Army Green Berets.

Non-state users

 Karen National Liberation Army
New People's Army
 Tamil Tigers

References
Notes

Bibliography

External links
ST Engineering's website for the Ultimax 100

Firearms articles needing expert attention
5.56×45mm NATO machine guns
Squad automatic weapons
Machine guns of Singapore
Weapons and ammunition introduced in 1982